Song Yoon-ah (Korean: 송윤아, born June 7, 1973) is a South Korean actress. She is best known for starring in the film Jail Breakers (2002), as well as the television dramas Hotelier (2001), On Air (2008), Mama (2014), The K2 (2016), and Secret Mother (2018).

Early life
Song Yoon-ah was born in Seoul, but spent her childhood in Gimcheon, North Gyeongsang Province. She has two elder brothers, the first one is a doctor. While studying Cultural Anthropology as a freshman at Hanyang University, she was recommended by an older schoolmate to a modeling agency. Song made her entertainment debut when she won three awards at the KBS Super Talent Contest in 1995, and began appearing in magazine advertisements and as an extra on TV shows.

Career
In 1998, Song rose to fame as the antagonist in Mister Q, playing the head of the design department in an underwear company who bullies the heroine; the trendy drama was a big hit, with a peak viewership rating of 45.3%. Over the next few years, Song became well known for her roles in TV dramas such as Paper Crane (1998), The Boss (1999), and Hotelier (2001).

Her first few films did not make a significant impression at the box office. But in late 2002, Song starred in one of the bigger commercial hits of the year, Jail Breakers with actors Sol Kyung-gu and Cha Seung-won. Her energetic performance in Kim Sang-jin's comedy was recognized with Best Supporting Actress trophies from the Blue Dragon Film Awards, the Chunsa Film Art Awards, and the Grand Bell Awards. Song next played an anthropologist from the National Institute of Scientific Investigation in the 2004 horror film Face.

In 2006, she reunited onscreen with Sol Kyung-gu in Lost in Love, a low-key melodrama directed by Choo Chang-min about two college friends who drift apart and reconnect over the course of ten years. Arang followed, in which Song played a detective on the trail of a serial killer; this was her first time to get top billing over a male costar (rookie actor Lee Dong-wook). But like Face, her previous project in the horror genre, Arang was a commercial and critical failure. Song returned to television with My Beloved Sister, in the title role of a graduate art student who grew up wealthy but must suddenly take on the responsibilities as head of the family and take care of her younger brothers after their father goes bankrupt then disappears.

Her next hit drama came in 2008 with On Air, a behind-the-scenes look at the Korean entertainment industry. Song was cast in the role of scribe Kim Eun-sook's alter ego, a successful, acerbic screenwriter who clashes egos with a top actress (played by Kim Ha-neul) while falling for a TV director (played by Park Yong-ha). Then in the 2009 thriller Secret, Song played the wife of a homicide detective—she becomes the prime suspect in a brutal murder he's investigating, while in the 2010 tearjerker Wedding Dress, her character is a widowed designer who is diagnosed with cancer and begins sewing the ultimate parting gift, a special dress for her young daughter's wedding, which she will never get to see.

After getting married in 2009 and giving birth in 2010, Song went on a five-year hiatus from acting. She became an adjunct professor and part-time lecturer at Seoul Arts College in 2010, as a faculty member of the Department of Performing Arts and the Department of Broadcasting, Entertainment and Visual Arts. Apart from occasional stints as an awards ceremony host (she hosted the Korean Film Awards from 2003 to 2010), in 2011 she also joined the cooking show Food Essay on cable channel Olive, and served as a judge on the first season of talent-reality show Korea's Got Talent.

Song made her acting comeback in the 2014 drama series Mama, which revolved around a terminally ill single mother's quest to find a loving family for her son before her impending death, leading to her befriending the current wife of a former lover. Her performance won Best Television Actress at the 51st Baeksang Arts Awards.

In 2016, Song played a villain in action drama The K2.

In 2017, she returned to the big screen and acted as a war correspondent in VR film Nine Days. The film is planned to exhibit in Sundance Film Festival, Cannes Film Festival and Venice Film Festival. The same year, she was cast in the film Stone, her first feature film in 7 years. And the film has invited to the 23rd Busan International Film Festival.

In 2018, Song was cast in SBS mystery family drama Secret Mother.

Song then starred in JTBC's 2020 pre-produced 19+ age-restricted series Graceful Friends.

Song was cast in Channel A's series for the first time with melodrama mystery Show Window: The Queen's House.

Personal life
Song married actor Sol Kyung-gu on May 28, 2009 in a Catholic church in Bangbae-dong followed by a reception at the Ritz-Carlton Hotel in Seoul. Both graduates of Hanyang University, they acted opposite each other in Jail Breakers (2002) and Lost in Love (2006). Their son Sol Seung-yoon was born on August 3, 2010.

In 2014, Song filed a defamation suit against 57 netizens who spread online rumors that she began having an extramarital affair with Sol in 2002 while he was still married to his first wife and was the cause of their divorce in 2006. Sol and Song have denied these rumors, stating that their relationship started in 2007.

Philanthropy 
On February 13, 2023, Song donated 50 million won to help 2023 Turkey–Syria earthquake, by donating money through Korea's UNICEF Committee with participation in the Emergency Relief for Children Victims of the Earthquake in Turkey and Syria' programme along with Sol Kyung-gu.

Filmography

Film

Television series

Television show

Web shows

Hosting

Discography

Awards and nominations

References

External links
 
 
 

1973 births
Living people
South Korean female models
South Korean film actresses
South Korean television actresses
Hanyang University alumni
People from Seoul
People from North Gyeongsang Province
South Korean Roman Catholics
Best Actress Paeksang Arts Award (television) winners